(born Mikio Tōma, 當眞 美喜男, Tōma Mikio, July 21, 1961) is a Japanese television personality, actor and businessman. Haga was born in USCAR to an American father and a Japanese mother.

On June 30, 2007, Haga was arrested along with four others including former world champion professional boxer Jiro Watanabe, actor Ginji Yoshikawa[jp], and two affiliates of the Yamaguchi-gumi syndicate; one Toshikazu Kawakita and the other unidentified.
The group were arrested over allegedly blackmailing a real estate agent in Osaka into forgiving 400 million yen's worth of Haga's debt.

Roles

Variety 
Kuniko Touch
The Night of Hit Parade
Zōjiroshi Quiz Hint zo Pint

Television drama 
Food Fight (xxxx)
Handsome Man (xxxx) (Namihiko Kubō)
Hasadai Shōgun Yoshimune (xxxx) (Tokugawa Tsugutomo)
Hōjyō Tokimune (xxxx) (Rokuhara Tandai Hōjyō Tokishige)
Kirawane Matsuko no Isshō (xxxx) (Detective Shiomi)
Kodoku no Kake ~Itoshikihitoyo~ (xxxx) (Samuel Miyate)
Kurama Tengu (xxxx) (Okita Sōji)
Ryūkyū no Kaze: Dragon Spirit' (xxxx)' (Tomonaga Arakaki)Street Fighter II V (xxxx) (Ken Masters)The Kindaichi Case Files (1995)

 Film Aladdin (Aladdin (speaking voice in 1993))Les Sous-doués (Julien)Seito Shokun (Shun Togishima)Sorekara (Kadono)Street Fighter II: The Animated Movie (Ken Masters)

 Video The Return of Jafar (Aladdin (speaking voice in 1995))Sagi Shiippei series

 Stage 
 My Fair Lady The Sound of Music''

External links 
 
 Japan Times: Actor Haga arrested over blackmail

References 

1961 births
Japanese businesspeople
Japanese male film actors
Japanese people of American descent
Japanese male stage actors
Japanese male television actors
Japanese male voice actors
Living people
People from Okinawa Island
20th-century Japanese male actors
21st-century Japanese male actors